Albert Rigby (1901 – 10 October 1963) was an Australian cricketer. He played one first-class match for Western Australia in 1926/27.

See also
 List of Western Australia first-class cricketers

References

External links
 

1901 births
1963 deaths
Australian cricketers
Western Australia cricketers